Lilyana Boyanova (born May 12, 1983 in Pleven) is a Bulgarian journalist and television presenter, known for her segment We Believe in the Good on bTV News. In 2016, she was the recipient of the "Saviour of Childhood" award from the National Association for Foster Care.

References

1983 births
Bulgarian journalists
Bulgarian television presenters
Living people